The Bega Mică is a left tributary of the river Timișaț in Romania. It flows into the Timișaț near Iohanisfeld.

References

Rivers of Romania
Rivers of Timiș County